Emiljano Musta (born 31 January 1992 in Elbasan) is an Albanian professional footballer who plays as a left-back or left midfielder for FK Kukësi in the Albanian Superliga.

Club career

Teuta Durrës
Following Elbasani's relegation from the Albanian Superliga, Musta signed a two-year contract with an option of a further one with Teuta Durrës along with his teammate Ardit Hila. On 16 October, he scored his second goal of the season during the 2–2 away draw against Skënderbeu Korçë, causing them the first draw of the season after six consecutive victorys. On 18 June 2017, following the end of his regular contract, Musta decided not to active his one-year renewal, leaving the club and becoming a free agent in the process.

Flamurtari Vlorë
On 19 June 2017, Musta completed a transfer to fellow Albanian Superliga side Flamurtari Vlorë.

Kükesi
Ahead of the 2019/20 season, Musta joined FK Kukësi on a one-year contract.

International career
Musta has represented Albania at under-19 and -21 level. He was part of under-21 team in their unsuccessful 2015 UEFA European Under-21 Championship qualifying campaign, where he was an unused substitute in team's last match against Austria.

Career statistics

References

External links

1992 births
Living people
Footballers from Elbasan
Albanian footballers
Association football midfielders
Albania under-21 international footballers
KF Elbasani players
KS Shkumbini Peqin players
FK Partizani Tirana players
KF Teuta Durrës players
Flamurtari Vlorë players
FK Kukësi players
KF Laçi players
Kategoria Superiore players